James A. (Jim) Piper (born c. 1949) is a New Zealand/Australian physicist, Deputy Vice-Chancellor (Research) and Professor of Physics at Macquarie University.

Piper studied physics at the University of Otago, New Zealand, and received a B.Sc. (Hons) in 1968.  He completed a Ph.D. in atomic physics, also at Otago, in 1971.  His post-doctoral research was on metal-vapour lasers, with Colin Webb at Oxford.

Laser research in Australia

Following his arrival to Macquarie University in the late 1970s, from Oxford, Piper established one of the first laser research centres in Australia.  Initially he directed his research toward
gas lasers, continuous wave metal ion lasers, cyclic pulsed metal vapour lasers, and metal ion recombination lasers.  He also added a laser development program on high-power tunable dye lasers for various applications including atomic vapor laser isotope separation.  In this area of research he is co-author, with Frank Duarte, of a number of papers on tunable laser oscillator physics.

Piper's research in solid-state lasers has focussed mainly on diode-pumped solid-state lasers and related thermal engineering, mid-infrared solid state laser materials, solid state Raman lasers, and novel self-frequency-doubling laser materials.

Awards
1982 Pawsey Medal, Australian Academy of Science
1984 Walter Boas Medal, Australian Institute of Physics
1994 Fellow of the Optical Society of America
1997 AOS Medal, Australian Optical Society
2004 Carnegie Centenary Professorship, Carnegie Trust for the Universities of Scotland
2006 Honorary Doctorate of Science, Heriot-Watt University, Scotland

See also
 Multiple-prism dispersion theory
 Multiple-prism grating laser oscillators

References

External links
 Piper's page at Macquarie

Australian physicists
Laser researchers
Living people
University of Otago alumni
Academic staff of Macquarie University
Year of birth uncertain
Fellows of Optica (society)
Fellows of the Australian Institute of Physics
1940s births